Joe Carollo (born March 12, 1955) is a Cuban-American politician who served as mayor of Miami from 1996 to 1997 and again from 1998 to 2001. Following his loss in the 2001 mayoral election, he served as Doral, Florida city manager from January 2013 until his firing in April 2014; he was reinstated in June 2017, then immediately resigned. He successfully ran for election to the Miami city commission in 2017.

References

1955 births
Living people
People from Caibarién
Cuban emigrants to the United States
Florida Republicans
Mayors of Miami
American politicians of Cuban descent
Hispanic and Latino American mayors in Florida
Latino conservatism in the United States